Martin Maximilian Emil Eichler (29 March 1912 – 7 October 1992) was a German number theorist.

Eichler received his Ph.D. from the Martin Luther University of Halle-Wittenberg in 1936.

Eichler and Goro Shimura developed a method to construct elliptic curves from certain modular forms.  The converse notion that every elliptic curve has a corresponding modular form would later be the key to the proof of Fermat's Last Theorem.

Selected publications
 Quadratische Formen und orthogonale Gruppen, Springer 1952, 1974
 
 Einführung in die Theorie der algebraischen Zahlen und Funktionen, Birkhäuser 1963; Eng. trans. 1966, Introduction to the theory of algebraic numbers and functions, in which a section on modular forms is added; pbk 2014 reprint of 1963 German original
 Projective varieties and modular forms 1971 (Riemann–Roch theorem); 
 with Don Zagier: The Theory of Jacobi forms, Birkhäuser 1985; 
 Über die Einheiten der Divisionsalgebren, Mathem. Annalen 1937
 Neuere Ergebnisse der Theorie der einfachen Algebren, Jahresbericht DMV 1937
 Allgemeine Integration linearer partieller Differentialgleichungen von elliptischem Typ bei zwei Grundvariablen, Abh. Math. Sem. Univ. Hamburg 15 (1947), 179–210. 
 On the differential equation uxx + uyy + N(x)u = 0, Trans. Amer. Math. Soc. 65 (1949), 259–278 
 Zur Algebra der orthogonalen Gruppen Mathem. Zeitschrift 1950
 Zahlentheorie der Quaternionenalgebren, Crelle J. vol. 195, 1955, with errata 
Quaternäre quadratische Formen und die Riemannsche Vermutung für die Kongruenz-Zetafunktion, Archiv Math. vol. 5, 1954, pp. 355–366 (Ramanujan–Petersson conjecture)
 Eine Verallgemeinerung der Abelschen Integrale, Math. Zeitschrift vol. 67, 1957, pp. 267-298
 Quadratische Formen und Modulfunktionen Acta Arithmetica vol. 4, 1958, pp. 217–239
 Eine Vorbereitung auf den Riemann-Rochschen Satz für algebraische Funktionenkörper, Crelle J. 1964
 Einige Anwendungen der Spurformel im Bereich der Modularkorrespondenzen, Mathem. Annalen 1967, (Eichler–Shimura theory)
 Eichler Eine Spurformel von Korrespondenzen von algebraischen Funktionenkörpern mit sich selber, Inv. Math. vol. 2, 1967 with corrections 
 The basis problem for modular forms and the traces of the Hecke operators, Springer, Lecture notes Math. vol.320, 1973, pp. 75–152

See also

Eichler–Shimura congruence relation
Eichler–Shimura isomorphism
Eichler cohomology
Eichler order
Eichler's proof of the CBH theorem

References

External links
 
 Martin Kneser, Martin Eichler (1912-1992), Acta Arithmetica vol. 65, 1993, pp. 293–296, Obituary (in German).
 Jürg Kramer, Leben und Werk von Martin Eichler, Elemente der Mathematik vol. 49, 1994, pp. 45–60.

1912 births
1992 deaths
20th-century German mathematicians
Number theorists
Academic staff of the University of Münster